Dejazmatch Haregot Abbai (Abay) KCVO (1909-1979) was an Eritrean businessman and politician.
He was member of political party known as  “Mahber Fikre Hager”  (Society for Love of Country) in Eritrea in the late 1940s. In 1952, following the Federation of Eritrea with Ethiopia, he was elected as a member of the newly created Eritrean Assembly. During the early days of the Federation (1952–55) he served in the positions of Director of Interior, Secretary of Justice and Secretary of Economy. In 1963, a year after the Federation ended and Eritrea was annexed by Ethiopia, he was appointed as the Mayor of Asmara (then the second largest city in Ethiopia). In 1974 with the onset of military dictatorship  Derg  in Ethiopia he was imprisoned in Addis Abeba along with most of former Emperor Haile Selassie cabinets, most regional governors, many senior military officers and other dignitaries where in 1979, he was killed by the military/socialist dictatorship in Ethiopia.

Notes 

1909 births
1979 deaths
People from Asmara
Mayors of places in Eritrea
Eritrean businesspeople
Eritrean people who died in prison custody
Prisoners who died in Ethiopian detention
20th-century businesspeople